Rippon is a surname. Notable people with the surname include:

Adam Rippon (born 1989), American figure skater
Angela Rippon (born 1944), British journalist
Geoffrey Rippon (1924–1997), British politician
John Rippon (1751–1836), English Baptist minister
Peter Rippon (born 1965), British broadcasting executive
Robert Henry Fernando Rippon (1836–1917), English zoologist and illustrator
Ted Rippon (1914–1991), Australian footballer

See also
 Rippin (surname)